Xyleutes xanthotherma is a moth in the family Cossidae described by George Hampson in 1919. It is found in Peru.

References

Moths described in 1919
Zeuzerinae